The 1967 Paris–Tours was the 61st edition of the Paris–Tours cycle race and was held on 8 October 1967. The race started in Paris and finished in Tours. The race was won by Rik Van Looy.

General classification

References

1967 in French sport
1967
1967 Super Prestige Pernod
October 1967 sports events in Europe